Leffe is a premium beer brand owned by InBev Belgium, the European operating arm of the global Anheuser–Busch InBev brewery giant. There are several beers in the range, and they are marketed as abbey beers.  They are brewed in large quantities and are widely distributed.

History
The abbey of Leffe was founded in 1152 on the river Meuse in the province of Namur in southern Belgium. Like many monasteries across Europe, the Premonstratensian (Norbertine) canons of the  brewed ale, starting in 1240.  Using knowledge passed from generation to generation and ingredients found in the wild near the abbey, the canons developed a unique ale with a subtle taste and high alcohol content, brewed only at the abbey.

The abbey has been damaged by both natural and human circumstances over the years: it was destroyed by a flood in 1460, a fire swept through the settlement in 1466, billeted troops damaged the brewery in 1735, and the outbreak of the French Revolution in 1794 resulted in it being abandoned, and the brewery destroyed. The canons returned in 1902.

In 1952, the production of beer was continued after a partnership with the Flemish based Lootvoet brewery in Overijse. This brewery was later bought by the international beer company Interbrew (now AB InBev). Leffe was then brewed in Mont-Saint-Guibert until Interbrew closed that brewery. Now all Leffe brands are brewed at the Stella Artois brewery in Leuven.

The 1952 agreement between the Leffe abbey and a commercial brewery is said to have been the first of its kind (royalties continue to be paid to the abbey). Today, Belgium's "abbey" beers are thriving  with several beers brewed under similar licences to Leffe as well as abbey beers named after abbey ruins or abbeys that no longer exist. The Affligem beer is part of Heineken's international portfolio. Other notable abbey brands include Corsendonk.

The Leffe museum in the town of Dinant, known as Maison Leffe, is open to visitors.

Brands

References

External links
 Official website
 Notre Dame de Leffe Abbey

Belgian beer brands
Belgian brands
InBev brands
Dinant
1152 establishments in Europe